Mario Gómez (born 1985) is a German football striker.

Mario Gómez may also refer to:

Academics
 Mario Ojeda Gómez (1927–2013), Mexican scholar and internationalist

Politicians
 Mario Gomez (politician), mayor of Huntington Park, California

Sportspeople

Association football
 Mario Gómez (footballer, born 1957), Argentine football manager and former defender
 Mario Gómez (footballer, born February 1981), Spanish football right-back
 Mario Gómez (footballer, born May 1981), Peruvian football midfielder
 Mario Gómez (footballer, born August 1981), Honduran football midfielder
 Mário Gómez (footballer, born 1986), Colombian football midfielder
 Mario Gómez (footballer, born 1992), Spanish football centre-back

Other sports
 Mario Gómez (athlete) (1907–1971), Mexican sprinter

Other
 Mario Gómez, oldest of the Chilean miners trapped in the 2010 Copiapó mining accident